Franklin is an unincorporated community in Albemarle County, Virginia, located on the edge of the Pantops census-designated place.

References

Unincorporated communities in Virginia
Unincorporated communities in Albemarle County, Virginia